Bryan Cole (born 17 August 1956) is a former Australian rules footballer who played with Collingwood in the Victorian Football League (VFL).

Notes

External links 

1956 births
Australian rules footballers from Victoria (Australia)
Collingwood Football Club players
Montmorency Football Club players
Living people